Urostrophus is a genus of lizards belonging to the family Leiosauridae.

The species of this genus are found in Southern America.

Species
Species:

Urostrophus gallardoi 
Urostrophus vautieri  - Brazilian steppe iguana

References

Urostrophus
Lizard genera
Taxa named by André Marie Constant Duméril
Taxa named by Gabriel Bibron